Dinh Tran (born June 21, 2001) is an American figure skater. He is the 2022 Philadelphia Summer International silver medalist and a two-time U.S. national junior silver medalist (2018, 2019).

Personal life 
Tran was born on June 21, 2001, in San Francisco, California. His mother, Mimi Hoang, is a physical education teacher. The daughter of a Vietnamese mother and American soldier, she was left with her grandmother and grew up in Saigon, working as a housekeeper from the age of 8, before moving to the U.S. at 18.

Tran was raised in Tenderloin, San Francisco with two older brothers, Phong and Hao, and one younger, Trieu. His parents divorced when he was 14 years old. Growing up, he took flute lessons and performed with his school's jazz band. He received a full scholarship to attend Stuart Hall High School, graduating in 2020. He subsequently enrolled at California State University, Long Beach as a computer science major but soon switched to mechanical engineering.

Career

Early years 
Tran was first introduced to ice skating at a birthday party. He started taking lessons at the Yerba Buena ice rink, which offered free lessons to children from Tenderloin. Later, his family was granted a free membership at the Skating Club of San Francisco and also found a local sponsor.

Early in his career, he was coached by Jeffrey Crandell. Tran sustained a sprained ankle and shin splints in the 2017–18 season. In October 2017, he debuted on the ISU Junior Grand Prix (JGP) series, placing twelfth in Poland. He won silver in the junior men's event at the 2018 U.S. Championships.

Tran sprained his ankle three more times in the fall of 2018. At the 2019 U.S. Championships, he repeated as junior silver medalist.

Senior career 
By the 2019–20 season, Tran was training under Dee Goldstein. He placed ninth at his JGP assignment. He qualified to the senior men's event at the 2020 U.S. Championships, where he finished eighth.

Making his senior international debut, he placed ninth at the 2021 U.S. International Figure Skating Classic in September. In January, he finished eighth at the 2022 U.S. Championships.

In August 2022, Tran won silver at the Philadelphia Summer International. He then appeared at two Challenger competitions, placing thirteenth at the 2022 CS Lombardia Trophy and seventh at the 2022 CS Finlandia Trophy. Following Eric Sjoberg's withdrawal, Tran was invited to his first Grand Prix event, the 2022 Skate America.

Programs

Competitive highlights 
GP: Grand Prix; CS: Challenger Series; JGP: Junior Grand Prix

Senior and junior

Lower levels

Detailed results

Senior level

Junior level

References

External links 
 
 

2001 births
American male single skaters
American sportspeople of Vietnamese descent
Living people
Sportspeople from San Francisco
Competitors at the 2023 Winter World University Games